Pallandri, also spelled Palandri, originally Pulandari, is a Tehsil which serves as administrative capital of Sudhanoti district of Azad Kashmir. It is located at latitude 33° 42′ 54″ N, longitude 73° 41′ 9″ E,  from Islamabad, the capital of Pakistan. It is connected with Rawalpindi and Islamabad through Azad Pattan road. The main tribe of Pallandri is the Sudhan tribe.

History 
Pallandri was central for the violent anti government 1955 Poonch uprising, which was led by the Sudhans. Sudhans were angered by the removal of Sardar Ibrahim Khan, with an assassination attempt on Sher Ahmed Khan marking the beginning in February 1955.

Administration

Pallandri is divided into four tehsils, Pallandri, Mong, Tarar Khel and Balouch, and Pallandri serves as the headquarters of Sudhanoti. Jinjahell was the first capital of Azad Kashmir and is about 20 Kilometers away from Pallandri. The district is connected to Rawalakot by a  metaled road.

Educational institutes

For a town as small Pallandri, it has a lot of educational institutions. It has more than 50 colleges and schools. Some of the most prominent schools of Pallandri are, Fauji Foundation, Bilal Gul school, and college, Pilot High School and Read foundation. the most famous educational institution of Pallandri is Cadet college, Cadet College Palandri is situated about 100 km from Islamabad.The College Complex is situated on the south eastern flank of Pallandri town.first private English medium school in pallandri is jaffer Ali Khan school (Former KG school) run by sir Hameed(late).

Notable people

 Khan Muhammad Khan, member of the Jammu and Kashmir legislative assembly (Praja Sabha) from 1934 to 1946. Chairman War of Council of Azad Jammu and Kashmir in 1947 and then member of Defence Council. Founder of Sudhan Educational Conference.
 Sher Ahmed Khan (Late), 4th President of AJK (22 June 1952 – 31 May 1956)
 Sardar Sabz Ali khan and Mali Khan 1832
 Lt Col Muhammad Naqi Khan (late), Ex-MLA & Minister for Health and Food
 Brigadier M. Sadiq Khan (late) - Asst Chief of Staff CENTO, Ankara – Turkey (1970–73) - Chairman Governor's /Chief Minister's Inspection, Enquiries & Anti-Corruption Department & Secretary of Govt of the Punjab (1978–87) Member Punjab Public Service Commission (1988–90) - Minister Communications & Works, Housing & Physical Planning & Transport Departments Govt of the Punjab (1993) - Yagana-e-Kashmir Book (writer)
General Muhammad Aziz Khan, a retired four-star rank army general in the Pakistan Army who served as Chairman of the Joint Chiefs of Staff Committee, appointed in October 2001 until his retirement in 2005
 Dr Muhammad Najeeb Naqi Khan Minister for Health and Finance. He has been elected as the member of the Azad Kashmir Legislative Assembly five times (1991, 1996, 2006, 2011, 2016) from the Pallandri constituency and was a member of the Kashmir Council from 2001 to 2006
 Brigadier Arshad Iqbal, serving as a station commander Mangla Cantt, commander planning and Log area, serving 1 star, general. On his meritorious contribution to the security and national interests of Pakistan, world peace, cultural, He has been awarded Sitara Imtiaz Military which is indeed a great honor for whole Kashmir and Pallandri. On 23 March 2021, Brig, Arshad Iqbal was among the few Pakistanis who were awarded with Sitara-i-Imtiaz for their matchless services to the nation.

Notes

References

External links
www.pallandri.com
 http://www.dostpakistan.pk/pallandri/

success in Kashmir earthquake response

Populated places in Sudhanoti District
Tehsils of Sudhanoti District